David Victor Scott (13 January 1947 – 21 October 2022) was an English Anglican priest, poet, playwright and spiritual writer.

Scott was born in Cambridge, England. He was educated at Solihull School, then studied theology at Durham University and at Cuddesdon College. After ordination, he spent two years as curate at Harlow, then was appointed chaplain at Haberdashers' Aske's School. In 1980 he became vicar of Torpenhow and Allhallows in Cumbria. In 1991 he moved to Winchester to become rector of St Lawrence with St Swithun-upon-Kingsgate. He retired in September 2010 to Cumbria, where he died in Kendal.

Scott was an honorary canon of Winchester Cathedral and an honorary fellow of the University of Winchester. In 2008 the Archbishop of Canterbury conferred on him the Lambeth Degree Doctorate of Letters (DLitt).

Poetical works 

 A Quiet Gathering (Bloodaxe Books, 1984) , illustrated by Graham Arnold
 Playing for England (Bloodaxe Books, 1989) , illustrated by Graham Arnold
 How Does It Feel? (Blackie Children's Books, 1989) , illustrated by Alan Marks
 Selected Poems (Bloodaxe Books, 1998) 
 Piecing Together (Bloodaxe Books, 2005) 
 Beyond the Drift: New & Selected Poems (Bloodaxe Books, 2014)

Spiritual works 
 Moments of Prayer (SPCK, 1997) 
 Building Common Faith (Canterbury Press, 1997) 
 An Anglo-Saxon Passion (SPCK, 1999) 
 Sacred Tongues: The Golden Age of Spiritual Writing (SPCK, 2001) 
 Lancelot Andrewes: The Private Prayers (SPCK, 2002) 
 The Mind of Christ (Continuum, 2006)

Plays 
(for the National Youth Music Theatre, with Jeremy James Taylor)
 Bendigo Boswell, first performed 1983 (Weinberger, 1984)
 Captain Stirrick, first performed 1981 (Weinberger, 1985)
 Jack Spratt VC, first performed 1986 (Weinberger, 1987)
 Les Petits Rats, first performed 1988 (Weinberger, 1991)
 The Powder Monkeys (SchoolPlay Productions, 1993)

References

External links 
 Profile at Bloodaxe Books
 "University of Winchester announces honorary degrees" (2004)
 Lambeth degrees
 "Award-winning Vicar-poet to retire to Cumbria"

1947 births
2022 deaths
20th-century English Anglican priests
21st-century English Anglican priests
People from Cambridge
Holders of a Lambeth degree
English male poets
Alumni of St Chad's College, Durham